Strigulla is an extinct genus of insects in the family Idelinellidae. It existed in what is now Russia during the Kungurian age. It was described by D. S. Aristov and A. P. Rasnitsyn in 2012, as a new genus for the species Euryptilon cuculiophoris. S. cuculiophoris measured 10 millimetres in body length, with the forewings having about the same measurement.

References

External links
 Strigulla at the Paleobiology Database

Permian insects
Paleozoic insects of Asia
Prehistoric insect genera
Fossil taxa described in 2012
Fossils of Russia